Global Action Plan International or GAP International is a network of NGOs that specialises in sustainable behaviour change and is best known for its projects revolving around ESD. GAP International's mission is to empower people to live and work increasingly sustainably, at school, at home and at work. There are programmes designed for households and communities, schools and youth, and workplaces.

History 

Global Action Plan was first established in 1989 on the initiative of David Gershon (USA) and Bessie Schadee (Netherlands). Together they worked to produce the first draft EcoTeam workbooks in 1989. The Household EcoTeam Programme is an action programme designed to improve pro-environmental behavior in the household. GAP was quickly joined by other countries, with Canada, Germany, Norway, Sweden, Switzerland, and UK being among the first. The programme has continued to develop to this day.

In April 1995, Marilyn Mehlmann became the General Secretary of GAP International, a position she holds to this day. In 2011, Mehlmann was awarded the Rachel Carson Prize for her long-term efforts to involve individuals, companies and NGOs in acting sustainably. In January 2016, GAP International announced its partnership with the 17Goals Network.

Structure 

GAP International is an international network of organizations. Members are either organizations or personal members. An up-to-date list of members can be found on the website of Global Action Plan International.

GAP International is registered as a charitable organization and is based in Stockholm, Sweden. GAP International also has consultative status with the United Nations Economic and Social Council or ECOSOC.

References

External links 
GAP International website

GAP International web campus 
Environmental organizations established in 1989